is a Japanese television series which premiered on Fuji TV on 15 January 2012.

Cast
 Nao Matsushita as Yuriko Hayami
 Yoshihiko Inohara as Kyoichi Hayami
 Yuichi Nakamaru as Kaoru Hayami
 Jun Kaname as Kenji Hayami
 Yuki Morinaga as Yuzo Hayami
 Eiichiro Funakoshi as Keitarou Hayami
 Yuko Kotegawa as Yoko Hayami
 Takeo Nakahara as  Hiroshi Kanai
 Kazuko Kato as Michiko Kanai
 Kenjiro Nashimoto as Shigeo Muto
 Tetsu Watanabe as Genzo Ishida
 Taizo Harada as Aki Irie

Guests
 Hijiri Sakurai (ep.3-4)
 Goki Maeda (ep.4)
 Toshifumi Muramatsu as Satoshi Miyake (ep.4-5)
 Takashi Yamanaka as Kohei Inada (ep.6)
 Issei Takahashi as Akihiko Toritani (ep.8-9)
 Hiroyuki Onoue as Seiji Shiina (ep.9-10)

External links
  

Japanese drama television series
2012 Japanese television series debuts
2012 Japanese television series endings
Fuji TV dramas
Japanese romance television series